Police Station No. 7 is a registered historic building in Cincinnati, Ohio, listed in the National Register on May 18, 1981.

Historic uses 
This was built as Patrol 8, the patrol house for Cincinnati's Police District 8, which was near the bottom of the hill.  Patrol 8 was on top of the hill, at McMillan and Ravine St., so the horses didn't have to haul the patrol wagons up the steep hill.

Notes 

National Register of Historic Places in Cincinnati
Buildings and structures in Cincinnati
Samuel Hannaford buildings
Government buildings on the National Register of Historic Places in Ohio
Police stations on the National Register of Historic Places